Tochiakagi Takanori (born Masao Kanaya; October 31, 1954 – August 18, 1997) was a sumo wrestler from Numata, Gunma, Japan. He made his professional debut in January 1973, and reached the top division in May 1977. His highest rank was sekiwake, which he first reached in May 1979. Unusually he kept the rank for the following tournament even though he had a majority of losses (7–8), because there were few wrestlers below him with good enough records to replace him. This was the first such occurrence since the establishment of the six tournaments per year system in 1958. He beat three yokozuna, Wajima, Wakanohana and Mienoumi, in one tournament in November 1979, and was to win eight kinboshi in total during his top division career. He won four Outstanding Performance and four Fighting Spirit prizes. He was one of the few wrestlers to employ the rare foot sweep technique of susohari. In 1980 he was tipped alongside Kotokaze and Asashio as a possible ozeki candidate, but never achieved his potential due to an apparent aversion to hard training, and a smoking habit. He missed the November 1980 tournament because of a leg injury and thereafter had chronic problems with both his ankles.  In addition he had a poor diet and suffered from diabetes towards the end of his career. He fought in the unsalaried makushita division for 27 tournaments after being demoted from the jūryō division in 1985, longer than any other former sekiwake. He decided to retire when his stable master, former yokozuna Tochinishiki died in January 1990, although his name remained on the banzuke for the following tournament in the sandanme division, making him the first former sanyaku wrestler to fall this low since Ōyutaka in November 1985. He left the sumo world upon retirement. He died of a heart attack in 1997.

Career record

See also
Glossary of sumo terms
List of past sumo wrestlers
List of sekiwake

References

1954 births
Japanese sumo wrestlers
Sumo people from Gunma Prefecture
Sekiwake
1997 deaths